The 1995 NAIA Division I football season was the 40th season of college football sponsored by the NAIA, was the 26th season of play of the NAIA's top division for football.

The season was played from August to November 1995 and culminated in the 1995 NAIA Champion Bowl playoffs and the 1995 NAIA Champion Bowl, played this year on December 2, 1995 at Doc Wadley Stadium in Tahlequah, Oklahoma, on the campus of Northeastern State University.

Central State (OH) defeated Northeastern State in the Champion Bowl, 37–7, to win their third NAIA national title. It was the RiverHawks' second consecutive loss in the championship game and the Marauders' third title in six seasons.

Conference changes and new programs

Conference changes
 The Arkansas Intercollegiate Conference disbanded before the start of the season, with its football members departing for the NCAA Division II Gulf South and Lone Star conferences.
 This is the final season that the NAIA officially recognizes a football champion from the Oklahoma Intercollegiate Conference. The OIC, the second incarnation of a football conference with the same name, would complete one final season in 1996 before disbanding.

Conference standings

Conference champions

Postseason

See also
 1995 NCAA Division I-A football season
 1995 NCAA Division I-AA football season
 1995 NCAA Division II football season
 1995 NCAA Division III football season

References

 
NAIA Football National Championship